Born to Die is the tenth studio album by American hard rock band Grand Funk Railroad, released in January 1976.

The album's title is considered to be one of the group's more somber, straying away from the upbeat and cocky attitude that was so prevalent on previous albums, such as All the Girls in the World Beware!!! (1974), and focusing on darker musical and lyrical content concerning death, politics, and personal relationships. The title track was written by Farner in memory of his cousin who had died in a motorcycle accident. The more upbeat pop single, "Sally", released on 3 April, was written by Mark Farner for his then love interest, the actress/singer Sally Kellerman.

Track listing

Personnel 
 Mark Farner – guitar, vocals
 Craig Frost – keyboards, background vocals
 Mel Schacher – bass
 Don Brewer – drums, percussion, vocals
 Jimmy Hall – saxophone, harmonica
 Donna Hall – background vocals

Charts 

Singles

References

External links 
 [ Grand Funk Railroad chart history] at Billboard.com

1976 albums
Grand Funk Railroad albums
Albums produced by Jimmy Ienner
Capitol Records albums